Kevin Jones (born December 19, 1974) is an American politician and former Green Beret. He is a Republican member of the Kansas House of Representatives, representing the 5th district (Wellsville, Kansas in Franklin County, Kansas), defeating four-term incumbent Bill Feuerborn in 2012.  The American Conservative Union gave him a lifetime evaluation of 86%. 

Jones is the father of eight children.
On July 6, 2015, Jones ran the course on American Ninja Warrior and was eliminated in the first obstacle.

Sources

External links
Official State Webpage
Official Campaign Website
Ballotpedia
Votesmart
Openstates

Republican Party members of the Kansas House of Representatives
Living people
People from Wellsville, Kansas
1974 births
21st-century American politicians
American Ninja Warrior contestants